The final in Royal League 2004–05 season was between IFK Göteborg and F.C. Copenhagen.

The match was played on May 26, 2005 on Ullevi Stadium in Gothenburg.

Match facts

See also
 Royal League 2004-05
 UEFA match report

2005
Royal League Final 2005
Royal League Final 2005
Final
Royal League Final 2005
Royal League
Royal League
May 2006 sports events in Europe